Emohua is a town, and the headquarters of Emohua Local Government Area in Rivers State, Nigeria.
It comprises eight sub-villages, namely:

 Oduoha
 Elibrada
 Isiodu
 Rumuakunde
 Rumuche
 Mbu-eto
 Rumuohia
 Mbuitanwo

The last six are collectively known as Rumu-enyi.

The eight villages are usually written with the suffix -Emohua attached, for example Oduoha-Emohua.

Towns in Rivers State